The Second Battle of Saltville (December 20–21, 1864), was fought near the town of Saltville, Virginia, during the American Civil War.

After the defeat of General Stephen G. Burbridge's expedition against Saltville, Union General George Stoneman reassembled a force to destroy the saltworks there.  Stoneman's force included Burbridge's Division and a brigade under Brigadier General Alvan C. Gillem.

After defeating a Confederate force at Marion, Virginia on the December 17–18, Stoneman's expedition advanced to Saltville.  General John C. Breckinridge had 500 men at Saltville under Colonel Robert Preston.  Another brigade of cavalry was en route under General Basil W. Duke.  General Gillem led the Union advance and attacked first.  Burbridge joined the fight shortly after and the two Federal columns overwhelmed the town's defenses.  Colonel Preston ordered a retreat and Stoneman's troops entered the town and destroyed the saltworks, accomplishing the objective of the Union raid.

Battlefield preservation
The Civil War Trust (a division of the American Battlefield Trust) and its partners have acquired and preserved  of the Saltville battlefields.

Gallery

See also

Saltville Battlefields Historic District
First Battle of Saltville
Salt in the American Civil War

References

CWSAC Saltville
 CWSAC Report Update

External links
Battles of Saltville

Stoneman's 1864 raid
Saltville II
Saltville II
Saltville
Battle of Saltville II
Smyth County, Virginia
Saltville
1864 in Virginia
Saltville II
December 1864 events